This is a list of results for all the matches played from 1901 to 1950 by the Rio de Janeiro state football team.

Results

References

Rio de Janeiro state football team results